The Black Hole is a 2006 American television film produced for the Sci Fi channel, directed by Tibor Takács and starring Judd Nelson and Kristy Swanson.

Plot
Something goes awry at a particle accelerator facility in St. Louis and a black hole begins to form. A creature exits the hole and seeks out energy. As the creature absorbs energy, the black hole grows in size and destroys a large part of St. Louis. Before the creature can be hit with a nuclear bomb, it is lured back to the black hole and the black hole collapses on itself.

Cast
 Judd Nelson as Dr. Eric Bryce, Nuclear Physicist
 Kristy Swanson as Dr. Shannon Muir
 David Selby as Ryker
 Heather Dawn as Alicia
 Jennifer Lyn Quackenbush as Elizabeth (Jennifer Quackenbush)
 Christa Campbell as Advisor Coldwell
 Peter Mayer as General Tate
 Julia Sinks as Kayley
 James Anthony as Tolland (Jim Anthony)
 Kevin Beyer as Dr. Hauser
 Dan Buran as Kent
 Tim Snay as Hayes
 Adrian Rice as Lieutenant Samson
 Chris Nolte as Hendricks
 Robert Giardina as James
 Rick Tamblyn as Wagner
 Ermal Williamson as The President
 Eric Lutes as Russ Martin, TV Reporter
 Atanas Srebrev as Delta Team Leader (uncredited)
 Kevin Stroup as Dr. Hans Reinhardt (uncredited)

References

External links
 
 

2006 science fiction films
2006 television films
2006 films
Black holes in film
2000s English-language films
Films set in Missouri
Films set in St. Louis
Films shot in Bulgaria
Films shot in St. Louis
Syfy original films
Films directed by Tibor Takács
Films produced by Boaz Davidson
Films with screenplays by Boaz Davidson
2000s American films